Prisons in Switzerland are operated by the Swiss cantons, which are responsible for law enforcement in Switzerland. As of 2008, Switzerland has 124 prisons according to the Catalogue of Correctional Institutions (Katalog der Einrichtungen des Freiheitsentzuges) compiled by the Federal Statistical Office; other statistics, which account for various institutions being administratively associated with each other, report 117 prisons. Swiss prisons have a capacity of up to 6,736 detainees total (amounting to 89 detention places per 100,000 inhabitants), including up to 477 women and 105 minors. The detainees are housed in 4,531 single cells, 1,044 cells for multiple persons, 172 security cells, 200 disciplinary cells and 50 infirmary cells.

In 2008, Swiss prisons housed 5,780 detainees (77 detainees per 100,000 inhabitants), of which 5.8% were female, 1.2% minors and 69.7% non-Swiss nationals. Half of all detainees were serving prison sentences, a quarter were in pre-trial detention, six percent were detained for expulsion and extradition and three percent were reported as being in "protective custody and custody for other reasons". Additionally, in 2006, 5,333 persons served a prison sentence in the form of community work orders, and 114 served their sentence in the form of electronic monitoring house arrest.

in 2017, Prisoners that were locked up added up to about 6,900, while its maximum capacity is at about 7,500. The prison rate for Switzerland as of 2017 is up to 81 per 100,000. These numbers seemed to have slightly increased since 2008.

According to a 2006 U.S. government report, Swiss prison conditions generally meet international standards, but prison overcrowding is a problem, particularly in the cantons of Geneva, Zürich and Bern. The report cites a 2005 Swiss government report stating that one-third of the country's detention centers were at or above their designated capacity, and nine were overcrowded by 20 percent or more. Overcrowding to 200% of capacity caused a mutiny at Geneva's Champ-Dollon prison in 2006.

Since the 1950s, correctional policy, prison construction, and operation is coordinated in organizations set up through regional agreements between several cantons (Strafvollzugskonkordate). As of 2009, these are:
Northwest and Central Switzerland Sentence Execution Agreement (Strafvollzugskonkordat der Nordwest- und Innerschweiz) consisting of Uri, Schwyz, Obwalden, Nidwalden, Luzern, Zug, Bern, Solothurn, Basel-Stadt, Basel-Landschaft and Aargau
 Eastern Switzerland Sentence Execution Agreement (Strafvollzugskonkordat der Ostschweiz) consisting of Appenzell Innerrhoden, Appenzell Ausserrhoden, Glarus, Graubünden, Schaffhausen, St. Gallen, Thurgau and Zürich
 Latin Switzerland Sentence Execution Agreement (Strafvollzugskonkordat der lateinischen Schweiz) consisting of Fribourg, Geneva, Jura, Neuchâtel, Vaud, Valais and Ticino

Training of prison staff is the responsibility of the joint Swiss Prison Staff Training Centre (French: Centre suisse de formation pour le personnel pénitentiaire, German: Schweizerisches Ausbildungszentrum für das Strafvollzugspersonal, Italian: Centro svizzero di formazione per il personale dei penitenziari) in Fribourg.

List

References

 Except where otherwise noted, the notes pertaining to each prison are referenced to its website.
 Except where otherwise noted, all other data in the list are from:  Specific links are provided in the list.

Footnotes

External links

 

 

Switzerland
 
Prisons